Prins Karls Forland or Forlandet, occasionally anglicized as Prince Charles Foreland, is an island off the west coast of Oscar II Land on Spitsbergen in the Arctic archipelago of Svalbard, Norway.  The entire island and the surrounding sea area constitutes Forlandet National Park (Forlandet nasjonalpark).

History
The island was first seen by the Dutch explorer Willem Barentsz in 1596. In 1610, the English explorer Jonas Poole named it Black Point Isle. By 1612 the English whalers were referring to the island as Prince Charles' Foreland, after King James's son, Charles (later king of England and Scotland). The Dutch called it Kijn Island, after a merchant, who, climbing a tall hill in 1612, fell and broke his neck. The English built a temporary whaling station on the island's northern tip, known to the English as Fair Foreland (today Fuglehuken).

See also
 List of islands of Norway

References

 
Islands of Svalbard
Uninhabited islands of Norway